Shushanna Sargsyan (born 1992) is an Armenian chess player, Armenian Women's Chess Championship winner (2014).

Biography
In 2010, Shushanna Sargsyan won Armenian Girl's Championship in U18 age group. She repeatedly participated in the Armenian Women's Chess Championships finals, where she finished 4th in 2012, and ranked in 5th place in 2015. In 2014, Shushanna Sargsyan won Armenian Women's Chess Championship.

Shushanna Sargsyan played for Armenia in the Women's Chess Olympiad:
 In 2014, at reserve board in the 41st Chess Olympiad (women) in Tromsø (+2, =0, -0).

Since 2015, she rarely participates in chess tournaments.

References

External links

Shushanna Sargsyan chess games at 365Chess.com

1992 births
Living people
Armenian female chess players
Chess Olympiad competitors